Rajendra Pal Gautam  is an Indian  politician, Dalit activist,Social worker  and the former Minister for Water, Tourist, Culture, Arts & Languages and Gurudwara Elections in the Government of Delhi. He is a member of the Aam Aadmi Party and represents Seemapuri Assembly constituency in the Delhi Legislative Assembly.

Early life and education
Gautam was born in Delhi. He holds an LL.B. degree from Delhi University and is an advocate by profession. He is an Ambedkarite and Buddhist activist.

Political career
In 2014, he became a member of the Aam Aadmi Party. Gautam's term as an MLA in the Sixth Legislative Assembly of Delhi was his first. He defeated Karamvir of the Bharatiya Janata Party by a margin of 48,821 votes in the 2015 elections.  He was re-elected in the 2020 Delhi Legislative Assembly election.

Cabinet Minister, Delhi
He was a cabinet minister in the Third Kejriwal ministry since 14 February 2015  and held the charge of below listed departments of the Delhi Government. 
 Social welfare
 SC & ST
 Cooperative
 Gurudwara Elections
 Women & Child

Jai Bheem Mukhyamantri Pratiba Vikas Yojana 
As minister, Gautam held the charge of social welfare department in the Second Kejriwal ministry. Under his charge Jai Bheem Mukhyamantri Pratiba Vikas Yojana was started. Indian Express noted it as one of Arvind Kejriwal government's most ambitious programmes. In this program, free coaching is provided to children from the Scheduled Castes and Scheduled Tribes to prepare them for IIT JEE, NEET and other competitive exams. When the program started about 4,900 students enrolled for the free coaching classes. in 2022, around 15,000 are enrolled in various courses under this scheme.

Controversy
In  May 2020, he was criticised by the Indian Army for sharing a video curated and circulated by enemy agents. He later took the video down.

Social activism 
He taught about 450 children from poor families and worked on reducing addiction among the youth. He worked for upliftment and rights of Dalits. He was awarded the Samata Sainik Dal's Dr Ambedkar Award in 2017.

He operated a Non-governmental organization (NGO) called Partivartan and as of 2022 he runs the organisation, 'Mission Jai Bhim'. Gautam is the founder of the organisation, Mission Jai Bhim.

Resigned from the post of cabinet minister 

On 5 October 2022, Buddhist Society of India and Mission Jai Bhim jointly organized an event at Dr. Ambedkar Bhawan Rani Jhansi Road. Gautam attended the event and later said that in the event "more than 10,000 people pledged to join Buddhism and work for making India free from casteism and untouchability." During the event, while Gautam was on stage, the attendees repeated Twenty-two vows that B. R. Ambedkar had administered to his followers. Among other vows it included a vow that they would not pray to Hindu gods and goddesses. The 22-point pledge was first made in 1956 by Dr B. R. Ambedkar when he renounced Hinduism and converted to Buddhism. Since then such events have been organised regularly, where people who are mainly from the oppressed castes, recite the 22 vows and embrace Buddhism.

Indian Express reported that 66 years after the twenty-two vows of Ambedkar were first made, Bharatiya Janata Party (BJP) leaders chose to suddenly take offence to the vows.  It was reported that there were no derogatory words for Hindu gods and goddesses in the pledge, but it simply asserts that the speaker shall not worship them. The BJP leaders criticised Gautam for his speech and made legal complaints against him. BJP attacked AAP, AAP president Arvind Kejriwal and Gautam during the campaign for 2022 Gujarat Legislative Assembly election. 

Gautam responded saying that BJP was spreading rumours about him and said, "If I believe in Buddhism, what is wrong with that? If the BJP has to complain, they can. The Constitution of India gives us the freedom to follow any religion. The BJP is losing ground and it is afraid of the Aam Aadmi Party. They can only lodge fake cases against us". He said, "I am a very religious person. I personally respect all the gods and goddesses and can never even dream of insulting the deities by my actions or words. I did not say any word towards anyone's faith, I respect everyone's faith. In my speech, I spoke on education, health, employment, inflation and social equality. But then BJP people are spreading false rumors about me. I am deeply hurt by this act of BJP people and I apologize with folded hands to all those people who have been hurt in any way due to this propaganda of BJP". 

On 9 October 2022, he resigned from the post of cabinet minister. AAP has not officially responded to the event. He said in his resignation letter that he had noticed that the BJP had been targeting Arvind Kejriwal and the AAP for Gautam's participation in the event. He said that those attacks had saddened him. He said, "I will continue to work for the party to strengthen India and will follow the teachings of Babasaheb Ambedkar all my life. The BJP has a problem with me following the teaching of Babasaheb Ambedkar and is using this to play dirty politics… I do not wish that due to me my leader Mr. Kejriwal and my party are harmed in anyway."

On 10 October 2022, Gautam, shared a video that reportedly showed some Upper caste men beating a Dalit man. Gautam called Narendra Modi "a weak PM" and demanded his resignation and resignation of Uttar Pradesh Chief Minister Yogi Adityanath over the incidents. He said, "Stop these casteist shoddy acts Narendra Modi ji. Otherwise you resign. Chief Minister of Uttar Pradesh is a complete failure in handling law and order. I know that you are such a weak Prime Minister that you can't even take resignation from him! You don't worry, my Bahujan Samaj will answer".

Electoral performance

See also

 Government of India
 Politics of India

References 

 
  

 

People from New Delhi
Delhi MLAs 2015–2020
Delhi MLAs 2020–2025
Living people
1968 births
Aam Aadmi Party MLAs from Delhi
Indian Buddhists
Indian activists
20th-century Buddhists
21st-century Buddhists
Buddhist activists
20th-century Indian lawyers
21st-century Indian lawyers